Olga Fateeva (Russian: Ольга  Фатеева; born 4 May 1984) is a Russian volleyball player. She was a member of the national team that won the gold medal at the 2010 World Championship.

References

1984 births
Living people
Russian women's volleyball players
Volleyball players at the 2008 Summer Olympics
Olympic volleyball players of Russia
People from Pavlohrad
20th-century Russian women
21st-century Russian women